Frederick Hugh Gordon Cunliffe,  was a British Brigadier who was one of the main British commanders at the Kamerun campaign and earned a key victory at the Siege of Mora.

Biography

Early life and family
Frederick was born on 6 September 1861 as the son of Major General George Gordon Cunliffe and Pauline Lumsdaine. He married Ella Sophie Gaussen in 1895 and had Cecile Gertrude Cunliffe.

Military service
Cunliffe began his military service by studying at the United Services College, Westward Ho! and entered service initially on the 1st Warwickshire Militia before serving in the 9th Queen's Royal Lancers in 1887.

His first instance of military combat was in the Hazara Expedition of 1891 and like all members of the expedition, gained the India General Service Medal, Clasp Hazara 1891. He later also participated at the Chitral Expedition and the Second Boer War in dispatches.

World War I
When World War I broke out, Cunliffe was Commandant of the Nigeria Regiment and was assigned to the Kamerun campaign and around 1915, in order to take the German fortresses at Garua, he commenced the Second Battle of Garua which ended in a British victory and pushed further to give pressure to Central Kamerun and would again, engage the Germans at the Battle of Ngaundere which also ended in a British victory.

Later on, he was the prime British commander on the later half of the Siege of Mora, arriving on 23 August to reinforce the siege. Due to his strong efforts in defeating the Germans, managed to make Captain Ernst von Raben surrender with the terms of offering Raben a safe passage back home along with providing him £2000 to pay his Askaris. Due to his victory at Mora, Cunliffe received the Companion of the Order of St Michael and St George in 1916. Cunliffe was then assigned as Brigadier of the HQ unit from 1917 to 1919. After the end of the war, he was Commandeur of the Legion of Honour and the Officer of the Order of St. Maurice and St. Lazarus.

Later years
Cunliffe died on 13 June 1955 in London at the old age of 93.

References

1861 births
1955 deaths
British Army brigadiers
British Army generals of World War I
British Army personnel of the Second Boer War
Companions of the Order of St Michael and St George
Canadian Knights Commander of the Order of the Bath
Commandeurs of the Légion d'honneur